Francesco Gabrielli was a school teacher who wrote the first rules for Football in Italy and came up with many of the football terms used in Italian football. Many of these things were inspired through his practice of gymnastics.

References

1857 births
1899 deaths
Italian schoolteachers
Sportspeople from Bologna